During Josip Broz Tito's presidency and in the years following his death in 1980, several places in the Socialist Federal Republic of Yugoslavia and across the world were named or renamed in honor of him as part of his cult of personality. Since the breakup of Yugoslavia, several towns and squares in the former nation have reverted their names. Numerous streets were also named after Tito, both in former Yugoslavia as well as elsewhere as an honour to a foreign dignitary.

Cities formerly named after Tito
A total of eight towns and cities were named after Tito. Right after World War II, four municipalities whose role in the partisan resistance movement was perceived as significant gained the adjective "Tito's" (locally Titov/Titova/Titovo), while the capital of the smallest federal republic of Montenegro was renamed Titograd (Tito-city). After Tito's death in 1980, four more cities were added, for a total of one in each of the Yugoslav six federal republics and two autonomous provinces. These were as follows:

Montenegro
 Titograd, July 13, 1946 – April 2, 1992 – Podgorica

Bosnia and Herzegovina
 Titov Drvar, 1981–1991 – Drvar, Canton 10, Federation of Bosnia and Herzegovina

Croatia
 Titova Korenica, December 5, 1945 – February 7, 1997 – Korenica

Serbia
 Titovo Užice, 1946–1992 – Užice
 Titov Vrbas, 1983–1992 – Vrbas, Vojvodina
 Titova Mitrovica, 1981–1992 – Kosovska Mitrovica

Slovenia
 Titovo Velenje, October 10, 1981 – July 17, 1990 – Velenje

North Macedonia
 Titov Veles, 1946–1996 – Veles
With the dissolution of Yugoslavia, each city was renamed.

Streets and squares

Many towns in the countries of former Yugoslavia and in other countries have streets and squares named after him.

Slovenia
 Ilirska Bistrica: Trg Maršala Tita (main square)
 Jesenice: Cesta Maršala Tita
 Koper: Titov trg (main square)
 Logatec: Titova ulica
 Ljubljana: Titova cesta (renamed to Slovenska cesta (Slovenian Avenue) in 1991); Titova cesta, a section of Štajerska cesta named after Tito in 2009. After Tito street decision in Slovenia renamed to Štajerska cesta.
 Maribor: Titova cesta (main street), Titov most (Tito's Bridge)
 Postojna: Titov trg (main square), Titova cesta
 Radeče: Titova ulica
 Radenci: Titova cesta
 Senovo: Titova cesta
 Slovenska Bistrica: Titova cesta
 Tolmin: Trg Maršala Tita (main square)
 Velenje: Titov trg (main square with highest Tito's statue in the world)

In 2011, 2 years after a street in Ljubljana was named after Tito, the Constitutional Court of Slovenia ruled that naming of a new street after Josip Broz Tito was unconstitutional. The court unanimously ruled that Tito symbolizes severe human rights violations, and that naming the street after him glorifies totalitarian regime and violates human dignity. In 2020, the Constitutional Court of Slovenia allowed a referendum against the renaming of Tito's street in Radenci. In contrast to the decision about the street in Ljubljana, the street in Radenci had been named after Tito more than 40 years ago; the court rejected the mayor's claim that a referendum to keep the name would violate the constitution.

Croatia
 Banovci: Ulica maršala Tita
 Buje: Trg J.B. Tita
 Buzet: Titov trg
 Celine Goričke (Marija Gorica): Ulica maršala Tita
 Fažana: Titova riva
 Kumrovec: Ulica Josipa Broza
 Labin: Titov trg (main square)
 Lovran: Šetalište maršala Tita
 Matulji: Trg maršala Tita
 Nedelišće: Ulica Maršala Tita
 Novigrad: Ulica Josipa Broza Tita
 Novo Selo Rok (Čakovec): Ulica Maršala Tita
 Opatija: Ulica Maršala Tita
 Poreč: Obala maršala Tita
 Pula: Titov park
 Rabac: Obala maršala Tita
 Rijeka: Titov trg
 Rovinj: Trg maršala Tita
 Selce (Crikvenica): Ulica maršala Tita (suggested to be renamed to Jean-Michel Nicolier Street)
 Šenkovec: Ulica maršala Tita
 Starogradacki Marof (Stari Gradac): Maršala Tita
 Turopolje: Ulica maršala Tita
 Umag: Obala maršala Tita
 Veli Lošinj: Obala maršala Tita
 Vinkovački Banovci: Ulica maršala Tita
 Vrsar: Obala maršala Tita
 Zabok: Ulica Josipa Broza Tita
 Zmajevac, Suza : Ulica maršala Tita

Name changes are announced in Selce, Varaždinske Toplice and Velika Gorica.

Former
 Karlovac: Trg Josipa Broza Tita (now Trg hrvatskih branitelja)
 Šibenik: Poljana maršala Tita (now Poljana)
 Mursko Središće: Ulica Josipa Broza Tita (now Ulica Republike Hrvatske)
 Zadar: Obala Maršala Tita (now Obala kralja Petra Krešimira IV)
 Zagreb: Trg maršala Tita (now Trg Republike Hrvatske). In February 2008, 2,000 protestors gathered on Zagreb's Josip Broz square, which is the site of the Croatian National Theatre, to demand it be renamed to Theatre Square. However, hundreds of anti-fascists accused this crowd to be revisionist and neo-Ustaše and the attempt to rename it failed. Croatian President Stjepan Mesić publicly opposed the renaming. However, the square was renamed to Republic of Croatia Square by mayor Milan Bandić in 2017.
Zaprešić: Ulica maršala Tita (now Cardinal Aloysius Stepinac Street)
 Varaždinske Toplice: Ulica Maršala Tita (now dr. Franjo Tuđman Street)
 Velika Gorica: Trg maršala Tita (now Trg grada Vukovara)

Bosnia and Herzegovina
The only towns in Republika Srpska that names a street after Tito are Kozarac and Srebrenica; all other towns are in the Federation of Bosnia and Herzegovina
 Bihać: Trg maršala Tita
 Bosanska Krupa: Ulica maršala Tita
 Bratunac: Ulica maršala Tita
 Breza: Titova ulica
 Drvar: Titova ili Put Oficirske Škole
 Foča: Titov Most
 Goražde: Ulica maršala Tita
 Gradačac: Titova ulica
 Jajce: Ulica maršala Tita
 Jelah: Titova ulica
 Konjic: Ulica maršala Tita
 Kozarac:Ulica maršala Tita
 Lukavac: Titova ulica
 Mostar: Ulica maršala Tita
 Novi Travnik: Ulica maršala Tita (former?)
 Odžak: Titova ulica
 Sarajevo: Ulica Maršala Tita (main street)
 Srebrenica: Ulica Maršala Tita
 Tešanj: Ulica maršala Tita
 Tuzla: Titova ulica
 Zavidovići: Ulica Maršala Tita
 Zenica: Titova ulica
 Živinice: Titova ulica

Former
 Bugojno: Ulica maršala Tita (now Sultan Ahmedova)

Serbia
 Banja Koviljača: Maršala Tita
 Boleč: Maršala Tita
 Čokot: Maršala Tita
 Dobanovci: Maršala Tita
 Jakovo, Beograd: Maršala Tita
 Krepoljin: Maršala Tita
 Kraljevo: Titogradska
 Krupanj: Maršala Tita
 Kumane: Maršala Tita
 Lešnica: Maršala Tita
 Leštane: Maršala Tita
 Medoševac: Maršala Tita
 Meljak: Maršala Tita
 Mezgraja: Maršala Tita
 Niš: Naselje Marsala Tita (Durlan)
 Pajkovac: Maršala Tita
 Palilula, Belgrade: Maršala Tita
 Petrovac na Mlavi: Titov gaj
 Požarevac: Titogradska
 Požeženo: Maršala Tita
 Preševo: Maršala Tita
 Slanci: Maršala Tita
 Tabanović: Maršala Tita
 Umčari: Maršala Tita
 Vranje: Titogradska
 Žagubica: Maršala Tita
 Zaklopača: Maršala Tita
 Železnik, Beograd: Titova
 Zvezdara, Beograd: Titov gaj

 Vojvodina
 Ada: Maršala Tita
 Adorjan: Maršala Tita
 Aradac: Maršala Tita
 Bač: Maršala Tita
 Bačka Topola: Maršala Tita; 
Pobeda: Maršala Tita
 Bački Brestovac:Maršala Tita
 Bački Gračac: Maršala Tita
 Bački Petrovac: Ulica maršala Tita
 Banatska Dubica: Maršala Tita
 Banatski Dvor: Maršala Tita
 Bajša: Maršala Tita
 Banatsko Novo Selo: Maršala Tita
 Belo Blato: Maršala Tita
 Bočar: Maršala Tita
 Boka: Maršala Tita
 Čantavir: Maršala Tita
 Čestereg: Maršala Tita
 Čoka: Maršala Tita
 Čortanovci: Maršala Tita
 Crepaja: Maršala Tita
 Crna Bara: Maršala Tita
 Crvenka: ulica Maršala Tita
 Deliblato: Maršala Tita
 Elemir: Maršala Tita
 Ečka: Maršala Tita
 Erdevik: Maršala Tita
 Farkaždin: Maršala Tita
 Feketić: Maršala Tita
 Gložan: Maršala Tita
 Jaša Tomić: Maršala Tita
 Kačarevo: Maršala Tita
 Klenak: Maršala Tita
 Konak: Maršala Tita
 Kovačica: Maršala Tita
 Padina: Elementary school Maršala Tita, Ulica maršala Tita
Kruščić: Maršala Tita
 Kula: ulica Maršala Tita
 Kulpin: Ulica maršala Tita
 Kumane: Maršala Tita
 Kucura: Maršala Tita
 Kupinovo: Maršala Tita
 Lovćenac: Maršala Tita
 Lukino Selo: Maršala Tita
 Maglić: Maršala Tita
 Majdan: Tito Marsal
 Mošorin: Maršala Tita
 Nova Crnja: Maršala Tita
 Nova Gajdobra: Maršala Tita
 Novi Bečej: Maršala Tita
 Novi Itebej: Maršala Tita
 Novi Žednik: Titogradska
 Novo Miloševo: Maršala Tita (main street)
 Obrež: Maršala Tita
 Padej: Maršala Tita
 Panonija: trg Maršala Tita
 Ratkovo: Maršala Tita
 Ravno Selo: Maršala Tita
 Ruski Krstur: Maršala Tita
 Samoš: Maršala Tita
 Sanad: Maršala Tita
 Selenča: Maršala Tita
 Seleuš: Maršala Tita
 Sivac: ulica Maršala Tita
 Skorenovac: Maršala Tita
 Stari Banovci: Titov Park Kosarkasko Igraliste
 Subotica: Aleja Maršala Tita (one of the main streets)
 Sutjeska: Maršala Tita
 Taraš: Maršala Tita
 Tomaševac: Maršala Tita
 Torak: Maršala Tita
 Trešnjevac: Maršala Tita
 Uzdin: Maršala Tita
 Vajska: Maršala Tita
 Veliki Radinci: Maršala Tita
 Vrbas: Ulica maršala Tita, Titova Vila
 Vrbica: Maršala Tita

Former
 Beograd: Maršala Tita (the main street, renamed back to Srpskih Vladara in 1992, now Kralja Milana)
 Zemun: Ulica maršala Tita (the main street, renamed back to Glavna ulica, meaning "main street")
 Šabac: Maršala Tita (the main street, renamed to Gospodar Jevremova in 2005.)
 Ruma: Maršala Tita (the main street, renamed back to Glavna ulica, meaning "main street")
 Užice: Maršala Tita (the main street, renamed to Dimitrija Tucovića street)
 Jagodina (Svetozarevo 1946–1992): Maršala Tita (the main street, renamed to Kneginje Milice in 1992)
 Kikinda: Maršala Tita (the main street, renamed to Kralja Petra I in 1993) and Titov trg (main square, renamed Trg srpskih dobrovoljaca in 1993)
 Zrenjanin: Maršala Tita (the main street, renamed back to Kralja Aleksandra in 1992)
 Novi Sad: Bulevar maršala Tita (renamed to Bulevar Mihajla Pupina in 1992)
 Batajnica: Josipa Broza-Tita (the main street, renamed to Majora Zorana Radosavljevica in 2004)
 Temerin: Maršala Tita (the main street, renamed to Novosadska during 1990s)

Montenegro
 Herceg Novi: Trg maršala Tita
 Bar: Ulica maršala Tita
 Podgorica: Josipa Broza Tita; Titove Korenice
 Rožaje: Maršala Tita
 Tivat: Obala maršala Tita

Former
 Cetinje: Titov trg (now Dvorski trg)
 Ulcinj: Bulevard maršala Tita (now Bulevard Gjergj Kastrioti - Skënderbeu)

North Macedonia

 Valandovo: Maršal Tito
 Berovo: Maršal Tito
 Bitola: Титово Ужице
 Delčevo: Maršal Tito
 Demir Hisar: Maršal Tito
 Demir Kapija: Maršal Tito
 Negotino: Maršal Tito
 Gevgelija: Maršal Tito
 Josifovo: Maršal Tito
 Kičevo: Maršal Tito
 Kočani: Maršal Tito
 Kriva Palanka: Maršal Tito
 Kumanovo: Титова Митровачка
 Makedonska Kamenica: Maršal Tito
 Makedonski Brod, Marsal Tito
 Radovis: Maršal Tito
 Skopje: Maršal Tito, Титовелешка
 Star Dojran: Maršal Tito
 Stip: Kej Maršal Tito
 Struga: Maršal Tito
 Strumica: ulica Maršal Tito
 Sveti Nikole: Marsal Tito
 Veles: Maršal Tito
 Vinica: bul. Tito

Former
 Bitola: Maršal Tito (now Širok Sokak)
 Ohrid: Kej Maršal Tito (now Kej Makedonija)
 Tetovo: Square Maršal Tito (former name)

Algeria
 Parc Tito in Bab Ezzouar

Angola
 Luanda: Rua Marechal Tito Presidente

Brazil
 São Paulo: Avenida Marechal Tito

Cambodia
 Phnom Penh: Josep Broz Tito Street

Cyprus
 Limassol: Josip Broz Tito street
 Dali: Marshal Tito street

Egypt
 Cairo: Josip Broz Tito Street, Huckstep, Qism El-Nozha (by the Cairo International Airport)

Ethiopia
 Addis Ababa: Josif (Broz) Tito's street

France
 Châlons-en-Champagne: Rue du Maréchal Tito

Ghana
 Accra: Josif Broz Tito Avenue

India
 New Delhi: J B Tito Marg
 Jodhpur: Shri Tito Chauraha

Italy
 Nuoro: via Tito
 Palma di Montechiaro: via Tito
 Parma: via Josip Broz Tito
 Quattro Castella: via Maresciallo Tito
 Reggio Emilia: via Josip Broz Tito

Kazakhstan
 Titova, oblast Qostanaj 110000, near Arkalyk

Morocco
 Agadir: Tito Street

Nigeria
 Abuja: Tito Broz street

Russia
 Moscow: Ploshchad Iosipa Broza Tito (Josip Broz Tito Square) above the Profsoyuznaya metro station.
 Titov, near Litvinovka, oblast Rostov

Tunisia
 Sousse: Marshal Tito Avenue

Zambia
 Lusaka: Tito Road

Mountain peaks

North Macedonia
 Titov Vrv (meaning Tito's peak), Šar Mountains

Asteroid
 1550 Tito (discovered by Milorad B. Protić)

Gallery

Notes

References

Places
Tito
Tito place names
Socialist Federal Republic of Yugoslavia
Tito Places
Cultural depictions of Josip Broz Tito